National Highway 444 is a national highway entirely in the union territory of Jammu and Kashmir in India. NH 444 is a branch of National Highway 44.

Route 
Srinagar - Badgam - Pulwama - Shopian - Kulgam - Quazigund.

Junctions  

  Terminal near Srinagar.
  Terminal near Quazigund.

See also 
 List of National Highways in India
 List of National Highways in India by state

References

External links 

 NH 444 on OpenStreetMap

National highways in India
National Highways in Jammu and Kashmir